The Klein Dairy Farmhouse is a historic house located in Kaukauna, Wisconsin. It is locally significant as one of the best local examples of the popular Queen Anne style and as the surviving farmhouse of the first dairy in Kaukauna.

Description and history 
It was added to the National Register of Historic Places on March 29, 1984.

References

Houses on the National Register of Historic Places in Wisconsin
Queen Anne architecture in Wisconsin
Houses completed in 1892
Houses in Outagamie County, Wisconsin
National Register of Historic Places in Outagamie County, Wisconsin